Letters from Alou is 1990 Spanish film directed and written by Montxo Armendáriz.

Synopsis 
Alou, a Senegalese man that has entered Spain illegally, can only find occasional jobs due to his situation. Thanks to the letters he sends regularly to his parents, we hear of his experiences and feelings as he laboriously tries to be integrated into Spanish society. He starts out on the coast of Almeria, working in the greenhouses. Then he travels to Madrid where he first comes into contact with illegal sales. He then makes his way to Segria, to work harvesting fruit, and, finally, to Barcelona, where he works in the clothes shop of another African immigrant. His adventure comes to an abrupt end when he's arrested by the police. But he crosses the Strait again, closing the circle that leaves a door open to hope.

Awards and nominations

Won
Cinema Writers Circle Awards
Best Cinematography (Juan Amorós)
Best Film
Best Screenplay – Original (Montxo Armendáriz)
Goya Awards
Best Cinematography (Alfredo F. Mayo)
Best Screenplay – Original (Montxo Armendáriz)
San Sebastián Film Festival
Golden Seashell (Montxo Armendáriz)
OCIC Award (Montxo Armendáriz)
Silver Seashell: Best Actor (Mulie Jarju)

Nominated
Goya Awards
Best Director (Montxo Armendáriz)
Best Editing (Rosario Sáinz de Rozas)
Best Film
Best Production Supervision (Primitivo Álvaro)
Best Sound (Eduardo Fernández and Pierre Lorrain)
Best Special Effects (Reyes Abades and Juan Ramón Molina)

References

External links

 

1990 films
1990s Spanish-language films
1990 drama films
Spanish drama films
Films about immigration to Spain
Films directed by Montxo Armendáriz
Films shot in Almería
1990s Spanish films